The Carr index (also: Carr's index or Carr's Compressibility Index) is an indicator of the compressibility of a powder. It is named after the scientist Ralph J. Carr, Jr.
 

The Carr index is frequently used in pharmaceutics as an indication of the compressibility  of a powder.  In a free-flowing powder, the bulk density and tapped density would be close in value, therefore, the Carr index would be small. On the other hand, in a poor-flowing powder where there are greater interparticle interactions, the difference between the bulk and tapped density observed would be greater, therefore, the Carr index would be larger. A Carr index greater than 25 is considered to be an indication of poor flowability, and below 15, of good flowability.

Both the Hausner ratio and the Carr index are sometimes criticized, despite their relationships to flowability being established empirically, as not having a strong theoretical basis. Use of these measures persists, however, because the equipment required to perform the analysis is relatively cheap and the technique is easy to learn.

References

General Bibliography

Particulates
Pharmaceutics